The white-collared foliage-gleaner (Anabazenops fuscus) is a species of bird in the family Furnariidae. It is endemic to eastern Brazil.

Its natural habitat is subtropical or tropical moist montane forests.

References

white-collared foliage-gleaner
Birds of the Atlantic Forest
Endemic birds of Brazil
white-collared foliage-gleaner
Taxonomy articles created by Polbot
white-collared foliage-gleaner